Eager Beaver may refer to:

Arts and entertainment

Fictional entities
 Eager Beaver, a club in the 1993 novel Strip Tease and film adaptation
 Eager Beaver, an animal in TV series Ranger Hal 1957–1969
 Eager Beaver, a robot in 1957 novel The Door into Summer
 Harold "Eager" Beaver, in 1957 film Eighteen and Anxious

Film and television
 The Eager Beaver (1946 film), a Warner Bros. cartoon
 "Eager Beaver", an episode of The Real Housewives of Miami (season 2)
 "Eager Beaver", an episode of Kingsley's Meadow
 "Eager Beaver", an episode of My Friends Tigger & Pooh
 "Eager Beaver", an episode of Lassie

Literature
 Eager Beaver, a 1963 children's book by Inez Hogan
 Eager Beaver, a comic by Slab-O-Concrete

Music
 "Eager Beaver", a 1944 single by Stan Kenton
 "Eager Beaver", a 1951 single by Hoagy Carmichael
 "Eager Beaver", a 1960 single by The Nutty Squirrels
 "Eager Beaver", a song in the 1962 musical No Strings
 "The Eager Beaver", a song on the soundtrack of 1996 film Fargo

Military
 Eager Beavers, a nickname for the 72d USAF helicopter squadron
 Eager Beavers, nickname for the crew of Old 666, a B-17E heavy bomber s/n 41-2666 during World War II
 The Eager Beaver, nickname for a B-17F heavy bomber s/n 42-29816 assigned to the 401st Bombardment Squadron during World War II
 Eager Beaver Air Portable Fork Lift Truck, produced by ROF Nottingham (1969–1973)
 M35 series 2½-ton 6×6 cargo truck, sometimes known as Eager Beaver

Other uses
 Eager Beaver, an achievement level in Beavers (Scouting)
 Fitz “Eager" Beaver (1922–1992), founder of Seattle newspaper The Facts
 Eager Beaver, a pinball machine, 1965

See also
 Eager (disambiguation)
 Beaver (disambiguation)